Dangerous Rhythm may refer to:

Ritmo Peligroso, Mexican post-punk/rock band known as Dangerous Rhythm from 1978 to 1984
Dangerous Rhythm, 1982 album by María Conchita Alonso
"Dangerous Rhythm", 1976 Ultravox! single off the album Ultravox!
"Dangerous Rhythm", 1984 Amii Stewart song off the album Try Love